Eglinton is a subway station on Line 1 Yonge–University of the Toronto subway. Located on Eglinton Avenue, it is central to the Yonge–Eglinton neighbourhood in Midtown Toronto. Eglinton station is the seventh busiest station of the Toronto Transit Commission (TTC).

Line 5 Eglinton will serve Eglinton station upon completion of the line, which is scheduled for 2023. Eglinton will then become an interchange station for the two lines.

Description

Line 1 station
The current station is on three levels, with entrances scattered throughout the street level in the surrounding area of Yonge Street and Eglinton Avenue. The concourse, fare gates and bus terminal as well as several shops are on the second level, and the Line 1 platform is on the lower level.

Eglinton station is the only one of the original 1954 subway stations (Eglinton to Union on Line 1) to retain its original vitreous marble wall tiles. The other 1954 subway stations used similar wall tiles with variations in colour schemes, but at the other stations, the tiles were replaced because of deterioration.

The Line 1 tracks approach the station from the south in an open cut before going underground at the Berwick Portal immediately before the station. Here the tracks divide sharply to go either side of the island platform. There is a crossover at this location, from when the station was the terminus of the line to reverse trains. North of the station, the line swings to the east, to run directly under Yonge Street in a bored tunnel.

Line 5 station

The Line 5 station structure (under construction) will cross the structure for Line 1 and have 5 levels:
 The street level, with an entrance near the southwest corner of Eglinton Avenue and Yonge Street
 The concourse level of the existing station
 The LRT upper concourse level, which will be slightly lower than the Line 1 platform level, and be split into east and west sections by the Line 1 tracks and platform
 The LRT lower concourse level, which will run under the Line 1 tracks and platform
 The LRT platform level, which will be the deepest level of the station complex upon completion of Line 5
There is a double crossover on the east side of the Line 5 station to reverse trains.

Bus terminal
The Eglinton station bus terminal is located at the south side of the station. The terminal's platforms and bus loop lie mostly within the building of a former bus garage. There is a station entrance and waiting room at the northeast corner of the bus terminal. From this entrance, passengers can descend to the Line 1 platform, and from the waiting room passengers can walk along a passageway connecting the bus terminal to the main concourse above the Line 1 platforms. Platforms on the south side of the terminal serve eastbound bus routes while those on the northside serve westbound routes. Buses can enter the terminal from either Berwick Avenue or Duplex Avenue.

Entrances
There are six entrances to the station in the surrounding area:

Current
 An entrance at the southwest corner of Yonge Street and Eglinton Avenue (Canada Square)
 An accessible, automatic entrance at Yonge Street, north of Berwick Avenue, which leads directly to the bus platform level

Temporarily closed
The following entrances were temporarily closed to accommodate Line 5 construction at Eglinton station:
 An entrance at the southeast corner of Yonge Street and Eglinton Avenue, at the CIBC
 An entrance on the northwest corner of Yonge Street and Eglinton Avenue
 An entrance at 2300 Yonge Street via the food court level of the Yonge Eglinton Centre
 An entrance at the northeast corner of Yonge Street and Eglinton Avenue, at the TD Bank

Public art
As part of a program to install artworks at six of the stations along Line 5 Eglinton, Eglinton station will feature an artwork titled Light from Within by artists Rodney LaTourelle and Louise Witthoeft. The artwork will be installed above the escalators leading down to the Line 5 platform. The 13-ton panel will be made of mirrored glass tiles and is inspired by minerals, crystals and gemstones evoking the "subterranean nature of rapid transit", according to the artists.

Crosstown construction

Twenty-four weekend closures of Line 1 Yonge–University at Eglinton station were scheduled for 2018 alone for construction activities related to the Crosstown (Line 5 Eglinton). The first closure was scheduled for February 10–11, 2018.

Structures to be constructed at Eglinton station as part of the Crosstown project are:
 Main entrance to Line 5 to be located just west of the existing, to-be-retained station entrance at the southwest corner of Eglinton Avenue and Yonge Street.
 Replacement entrances at the northwest, northeast and southeast corners of the intersection of Yonge Street and Eglinton Avenue connecting to underground concourses. 
 LRT platforms with rails laid 22 metres below ground.
 Separate Line 5 concourse at a lower level than the Line 1 platform. 
 Northward extension of the existing Line 1 platform providing room for escalator/elevator access down to the Line 5 concourse level.
 Emergency exit and ventilation shaft at 7 Eglinton Avenue East in a four-story structure to also be used as a Salvation Army church.
 Facility services building to be located over the Line 1 portal at Berwick Avenue, which will house a ventilation capable of emergency smoke extraction.

In November 2013, the TTC originally proposed to shift the current Line 1 platform approximately 70 m northward of its current location. Such a change would have allowed smoother flows of passenger traffic between the platforms for Lines 1 and 5, and avoided a situation where all transferring passengers are bottlenecked by only one transfer path, similar to the busy Bloor–Yonge station. The pocket track at the north end of the station would have had to be abandoned. However, this proposal was modified by March 2018 to shift the Line 1 platform north by only 24 m, allowing the pocket track to be retained. In the new area there will be an elevator and escalators down to the Line 5 concourse. At the south end of the platform, the elevator and stairs to the south station entrance will be retained but the platform edge will be walled off in this area.

History
Eglinton station opened in 1954 as the northern terminus of the original Yonge subway line, today a part of Line 1 Yonge–University. In 1954, the Yonge subway ran from Eglinton station to Union station, and replaced the Yonge streetcar line. Eglinton station sits on the site of the former Eglinton Carhouse, a streetcar facility opened in 1922, partly closed in 1951 to construct the subway line, and fully closed in 1954.

When opened in 1954, Eglinton station had a different bus terminal from what exists today. Eglinton's first bus terminal was located at the south side of Eglinton Avenue, just north of the current bus terminal. It initially had nine parallel bays within the fare-paid zone, each with a covered platform and staircases leading down to an east–west, underground concourse. There was also a platform 10 outside the fare-paid zone. In 1963, platforms 11–13 were added on the west side of platform 10 to handle increasing suburban traffic. The bus terminal had its own street entrance facing Eglinton Avenue at the north end of platform 10, about 50 metres east of Duplex Avenue.

With its opening in 1954, Eglinton station hosted trolley bus service serving neighbourhoods north of Eglinton Avenue. One bay was for 97 Yonge trolley buses to Glen Echo Loop, and two bays were for 61 Nortown trolley buses with separate bays for eastbound and westbound trips. The Nortown route was U-shaped serving Mount Pleasant Road east of the station, and Avenue Road to the west. The Eglinton garage, at the site of today's Eglinton station bus terminal, serviced trolley buses as well as diesel buses.

In 1973, Line 1 was extended to York Mills station and Eglinton station ceased to be a terminal station. Along with the extension, a pocket track was installed on the north side of the station to reverse some Line 1 trains. Also with the extension, Glen Echo Loop was closed and the Yonge trolley bus route was converted to diesel. This left Nortown as the only trolley bus route serving Eglinton station.

In 1991, the Nortown trolley bus route was converted to diesel, ending trolley bus service at Eglinton station.

In 2004, the original bus terminal from 1954 was closed because of safety concerns over its aging infrastructure. A replacement bus terminal was opened in the former bus garage just south of the old bus terminal.

In 2004, this station became accessible with the addition of elevators, and also with the closure of the old bus terminal which had required passengers to use stairs to reach the buses.

In 2016, the original bus terminal from 1954 was demolished to make way for construction of Line 5.

On November 17, 2016, Eglinton became the last station on Line 1 to be Presto enabled.

Nearby landmarks
There are several high-rise buildings at or near the corner of Yonge Street and Eglinton Avenue. Built directly over the station is the Canada Square Complex, which is home to TVOntario studios and the head offices of Canadian Tire. Yonge Eglinton Centre is at the northwest corner of Yonge and Eglinton. Further south is the residential Minto Midtown. Another nearby destination is Eglinton Park, west of Eglinton station.

Surface connections 

TTC routes serving the station include:

After Line 5 opening
After the opening of Line 5 Eglinton, the above connections will be replaced by the following connections (proposed ):

See also
Yonge–Eglinton

References

External links 

 
 A photo tour and detailed history of the station are available on the Transit Toronto website
  published by Metrolinx about an art piece to be installed at the new Line 5 main entrance 
  published by Metrolinx about excavation work to build Line 5 under Line 1 at Eglinton Station

Line 1 Yonge–University stations
Line 5 Eglinton stations
Railway stations in Canada opened in 1954